Khetri Assembly constituency is one of constituencies of Rajasthan Legislative Assembly in the Jhunjhunu (Lok Sabha constituency).

Khetri Constituency covers all voters from Khetri tehsil.

List Of Town/Villages in Khetri Constituency 
Babai, Barau, Basai, Beelwa, Charawas, Dada Fatehpura, Dalelpura, Dudhwa Nanglia, Gadrata, Gorir, Gotthra, Hardiya, Jasrapur, Kalota, Kankariya, Kharkhara, Khetri, Loyal, Madhogarh, Mandri, Manota Jatan, Manota Kalan, Mehada, Jatuwas, Jasrapur, Nagli Saledisingh, Nalpur, Nanglia Gujarwas, Nanuwali Bawari, Norangpura, Papurana, Rajota, Rasoolpur, Ravan, Sefraguwar, Shimla, Shyampura, Sihor, Tatija, Thathwadi, Tiba, Tyonda and more.

References

See also 
 Member of the Legislative Assembly (India)

Jhunjhunu district
Assembly constituencies of Rajasthan